Sydney Forest is an American composer and musician. Her music has been featured in several films, notably Studio Ghibli's English dub of Kiki's Delivery Service.

Biography 
Born in San Diego, Sydney Forest is the daughter of Gayla Peevey (who became famous in her childhood for singing the novelty hit "I Want a Hippopotamus for Christmas").
Upon entering into her career, Forest was signed to a deal with Disney Music Publishing shortly after she began gigging in Los Angeles. Her lyrics and music gained a great deal of attention including the National Academy of Songwriters’ Lionel Richie Songwriting Award. Forest has credited her inspirations to be from Charles Dickens to Honoré de Balzac, even Dr. Seuss and to Shel Silverstein. Later on, Forest appeared on the Warner Bros. network TV series Popular in which she had performed her own songs as melodic interludes.

Discography

Soundtrack 
Autumn in New York (2000) (songs: “Our Love Never Ends”)
Simply Irresistible (1999) (songs: “Once In A Blue Moon”)
Popular (1999) (songs: “High School Highway”)
Kiki's Delivery Service (1989) (songs: "Soaring" and "I'm Gonna Fly")

Filmography
Television
Popular
Episode: "The Phantom Menace" (1999) (Role: Herself)

References

External links
Sydney Forest on Bandcamp
Sydney Forest on last.fm
 
 

American women composers
21st-century American composers
Year of birth missing (living people)
Living people
American sopranos
21st-century American women singers
21st-century women composers
20th-century American composers
20th-century American women singers
20th-century women composers
Musicians from San Diego
21st-century American singers
20th-century American singers